USS Seven (SP-727) was a United States Navy patrol vessel in commission from 1917 to 1918.

Seven was built for private use as a motorboat of the same name in 1917 by D. R. Shackford at Norfolk, Virginia. On 29 June 1917, the U.S. Navy acquired   "Seven" directly from her builder for use as a section patrol boat during World War I. She was commissioned as USS Seven (SP-727) in 1917.

Seven spent her entire career in the Hampton Roads, Virginia, area, operating as a rescue boat for flying students until shortly before the end of World War I.

Seven eventually was deemed unsuitable for further naval use, and was stricken from the Navy List on 2 November 1918. The Navy ordered her destroyed. Disposed of by burning 12 November 1918.

Notes

References
 
 SP-727 Seven at Department of the Navy Naval History and Heritage Command Online Library of Selected Images: U.S. Navy Ships -- Listed by Hull Number "SP" #s and "ID" #s -- World War I Era Patrol Vessels and other Acquired Ships and Craft numbered from SP-700 through SP-799
 NavSource Online: Section Patrol Craft Photo Archive Seven (SP 727)

Patrol vessels of the United States Navy
World War I patrol vessels of the United States
Ships built in Norfolk, Virginia
1917 ships